Scott Lord (December 11, 1820 – September 10, 1885) was an American lawyer and politician who served one term as a U.S. Representative from New York from 1875 to 1877.

Biography 
Born in Nelson, New York, Lord attended the common schools and the local academies at Morrisville and Geneseo.
He studied law.
He was admitted to the bar in 1842 and commenced practice in Mount Morris, New York.

He moved to Geneseo, the county seat, in 1847.
He served as judge of Livingston County 1847-1856.
He resumed the practice of law.
He moved to Utica, New York, in 1872 and continued the practice of his profession.

Congress 
Lord was elected as a Democrat to the Forty-fourth Congress (March 4, 1875 – March 3, 1877).

He was one of the managers appointed by the House of Representatives in 1876 to conduct the impeachment proceedings against William W. Belknap, ex-Secretary of War.

He was an unsuccessful candidate for reelection in 1876 to the Forty-fifth Congress.

Later career and death 
He moved to New York City in 1877 and again engaged in the practice of law.
He represented some of the children of Cornelius Vanderbilt in an unsuccessful 1877 to invalidate his will.

He died in Morris Plains, New Jersey, September 10, 1885.
He was interred in Temple Hill Cemetery, Geneseo, New York.

References

Sources

1820 births
1885 deaths
Democratic Party members of the United States House of Representatives from New York (state)
New York (state) state court judges
19th-century American politicians
19th-century American judges